The Republic of Vietnam Campaign Medal, also known as the Vietnam Campaign Medal, is a South Vietnamese military campaign medal which was created in 1949, and awarded to French military personnel during the First Indochina War. During the Vietnam War (Second Indochina War), the South Vietnamese government awarded the Republic of Vietnam Campaign Medal with Device (1960– ) to members of the South Vietnamese military for wartime service and on March 24, 1966, to members of the U.S. military for support of operations in Vietnam. In May 1966, other allied foreign military personnel became eligible for the award.

The medal was awarded for two different periods of service in Vietnam. The first period for the award was from 8 March 1949 to 20 July 1954. The second period was from 1 January 1960 to the end of the Vietnam War (the date was to be given when the war ended and North Vietnam was defeated). On 30 April 1975, Saigon was captured by the North Vietnamese army and South Vietnam surrendered and disbanded. The medal was not awarded after 28 March 1973, when the last U.S. troops left South Vietnam in accordance with the Paris Peace Accords.

Award criteria

First Indochina War
The Republic of Vietnam Campaign Medal was created in 1949 and manufactured in France. The medal was awarded to French military personnel.

Second Indochina War (Vietnam War)
During the Vietnam War, the Republic of Vietnam Campaign Medal with Device (1960–) was manufactured in the United States and governed by Republic of Vietnam Decrees No. 149/SL/CT of 12 May 1964 and No 205/CT/LDQG/SL of 2 December 1965. The medal was established by the Republic of Vietnam Armed Forces Order No. 48, 24 March 1966. The medal is awarded to military personnel, both South Vietnamese for twelve months wartime service in the field, and allied foreign military who have directly participated for six months in "a large-scale military campaign during certain periods of time". All RVN and foreign personnel who served less than six months must meet the following requirements: were wounded by a hostile force; were captured by hostile forces, but later escaped, was rescued, or released; or were killed in action or otherwise in the line of duty. Awarded in a single class, the medal was awarded under the authority of the Chief of the Joint General Staff, Republic of Vietnam Armed Forces.

United States
Public Law 88–257 permits U.S. military personnel to accept the medal for service performed in Vietnam from 1 March 1961 to 28 March 1973, inclusive. Since March 1966, the medal may also be awarded to any service member who, while serving outside the geographical limits of the Republic of Vietnam, contributed direct combat support to the Republic of Vietnam Armed Forces for six months. This stipulation most often applies to members who performed Vietnam War support from the 7th Fleet (all members of the fleet serving off the coast of Vietnam), Thailand and Guam (air crews if aircraft out of Thailand and Guam; no ground support staff), and Japan. In such cases, a U.S. service member must meet the criteria established for the Armed Forces Expeditionary Medal (Vietnam) or Vietnam Service Medal during the period of service required to qualify for the Republic of Vietnam Campaign Medal. 

Personnel assigned in the Republic of Vietnam on 28 January 1973 must meet one of the following: served a minimum of 60 days in the Republic of Vietnam as of that date; completed a minimum of 60 days service in the Republic of Vietnam during the period from 28 January 1973 to 28 March 1973, inclusive.

Australia
The Republic of Vietnam Campaign Medal was awarded to Australian military personnel for service in South Vietnam during the period 31 July 1962 to 28 March 1973. The requirements for the award are: at least 181 days service, either continuous or aggregated, unless killed on active service (KIA); or wounded in action (includes psychological injury) and evacuated (medically evacuated other than being wounded does not meet requirement for medal); or captured and later released or escaped.

New Zealand
The Republic of Vietnam Campaign Medal was referred to as the "New Zealand Vietnamese Campaign Medal" (named the South Vietnamese Campaign Medal by the New Zealand Forces in South Vietnam). The medal was awarded to New Zealand Forces for service in Vietnam for six months between 1964 (arrived Vietnam June 1964) and 1973 (left Vietnam 22 December 1972). The medal was approved for wear in 1966.

Appearance
The Republic of Vietnam Campaign Medal is made of a gold colored metal in the shape of a 36 mm wide six-pointed white enameled star with six pointed gold rays between the arms of the star. In the center of the star is an 18 mm green colored disc bearing a gold colored map of Vietnam with three painted flames in red between North and South Vietnam, signifying the three regions of Vietnam. On the reverse of the medal is a circle bearing the inscription Chiến Dịch (Campaign) above and Bội Tinh (Medal) below the word VIET-NAM in the center. The suspension ribbon and service ribbon of the medal is green (to represent freedom) with three vertical white (to represent purity) stripes.

Ribbon devices
The Republic of Vietnam Armed Forces Memorandum 2655 (8 October 1965) authorized two sets of two silver-plated devices ( 1 " wide and " wide) for the suspension ribbon of the medal, and service ribbon of the medal and the miniature medal suspension ribbon, to indicate two separate periods of struggle against communism in South Vietnam. Both sets of the devices if authorized, could be worn on the ribbons.

Period 1: 8 March 1949 – 20 July 1954: The 1949–54 device is worn on the medal suspension ribbon and the 49–54 device is worn on the service ribbon of the medal and the miniature medal suspension ribbon.  These devices are not authorized for wear by American military personnel.
 Period 2: 1 January 1960 – the end of the war: The 1960–  device is worn on the medal suspension ribbon and the 60–  device is worn on the service ribbon of the medal and the miniature medal suspension ribbon.

The unusual appearance was caused by the Republic of Vietnam government stating that the 1960–  and 60– devices would show the dates of the Vietnam War from start to finish, with the ending year placed on the devices when the South Vietnamese had prevailed over the invading North Vietnam (the Democratic Republic of Vietnam) forces. However, on 30 April 1975, the South Vietnamese capital of Saigon was captured, and South Vietnam surrendered that day to the North Vietnamese army under the orders of General Duong Van Minh, who since 28 April was the president of South Vietnam.

Order of wear
The Republic of Vietnam Campaign Medal is considered a foreign award by the United States, South Korean, Australian, and New Zealand governments. The equivalent award from the U.S. Armed Forces is known as the Vietnam Service Medal. The joint Australian and New Zealand campaign medal awarded for service in the Vietnam War is the Vietnam Medal, with the Australian support service being recognized by the Vietnam Logistic and Support Medal.

See also

 Orders, decorations, and medals of South Vietnam

Notes

References

External links

Service Medals and campaign credits of the United States Navy Vietnam Campaign Medal

1949 establishments in Vietnam
1966 establishments in South Vietnam
Awards established in 1949
Awards established in 1966
Campaign medals
Military awards and decorations of Vietnam
Military history of Australia during the Vietnam War